A Fazenda 12 is the twelfth season of the Brazilian reality television series A Fazenda, which premiered Tuesday, September 8, 2020, at  on RecordTV.

Overview

Development
Marcos Mion returned as the main host for his third season, while comedian Victor Sarro replaced Lucas Salles as the show's online host and correspondent.

This season, the contestants moved into the Farm on Sunday, September 6, 2020, two days before the season premiere. Fire challenge episodes moved from Friday to Monday, while nominations and farmer challenge episodes moved from Monday and Tuesday to Tuesday and Wednesday respectively. Eviction episodes remained on Thursday nights.

Impacts of COVID-19
On August 22, 2020, twenty celebrities were placed in quarantine and tested for COVID-19 multiple times. Four additional celebrities were also quarantined alongside as stand-by contestants. Once inside the Farm the contestants would be tested weekly and have no contact with the production crew and any supplies delivered would be disinfected. The production crew and staff would also be tested and screened for symptoms, provided personal protective equipment, and work in socially distant pods.

Contestants
The first three celebrities were officially revealed by RecordTV on September 7–8, 2020, through the show's profile on TikTok. They were (in order): Jojo Todynho, Mariano and Victória Villarim. The season's full lineup of twenty celebrities was announced on the season premiere.

Future Appearances

After this season, in 2021, MC Mirella appeared with her husband Dynho Alves in  Power Couple Brasil 5, they finished in 12th place in the competition.

After this season, in 2021, Lucas Maciel appeared in Ilha Record 1, he finished in 13th place in the competition.

In 2022, Lucas Cartolouco appeared with his girlfriend Gabi Augusto in Power Couple Brasil 6, they finished in 9th place in the competition.

In 2022, Jojo Todynho appeared in Dança dos Famosos 19, she finished in 6th place in the competition.

In 2022, MC Mirella and Lipe Ribeiro appeared on De Férias com o Ex Caribe: Salseiro VIP as original cast member.

The game
For the first time since season 5, the contestants will be not divided in teams and the game will be played individually from Day 1.

Fire challenge
This season, three contestants (determined by a random draw) compete in the Fire challenge to win the Lamp power. The Lamp power entitles the holder the two flames (green and red) which may unleash good or bad consequences on the nomination process, with the red flame power defined by the public through the show's profile on TikTok among two options.

The winner chooses a flame for himself and delegates which contestant holds the other. The Flame holder's choice is marked in bold.

AliExpress power
On Day 63, all remaining contestants took part in a special challenge sponsored by AliExpress in order to win extra prizes. However, among the prizes was a special secret power which would unleash consequences at this week's nominations. Biel ended up winning the power. During the live nominations on Day 66, it was revealed that the power consisted of exchanging either the second or third nominee for any contestant of his choice.

Obligations

Voting history

Notes

Ratings and reception

Brazilian ratings
All numbers are in points and provided by Kantar Ibope Media.

References

External links
 A Fazenda 12 on R7.com 

2020 Brazilian television seasons
A Fazenda
Television series impacted by the COVID-19 pandemic